Aspang-Markt is a market town in Lower Austria in Austria.

Geography
Aspang-Markt is situated in the region Bucklige Welt submontane of the Wechsel mountain (1,743 m). It is completely surrounded by Aspangberg-St. Peter.

History
The village was first documentary mentioned in 1220. The importance grew with the development of the road over the Wechsel Pass.

Population

Politics
Of the 19 seats on the municipal council, the ÖVP has 15 and the SPÖ 4.

References

Cities and towns in Neunkirchen District, Austria